Klimenty Grigorievich Nagorny (1887 – 1918), was a Russian Empire sailor.  He was the personal assistant of Alexei Nikolaevich, Tsarevich of Russia. 

He originally served as a sailor of the imperial yacht. He served the former Imperial family during their exile in Siberia during the Russian revolution. He was killed shortly before the Execution of the Romanov family.

References

1887 births
1918 deaths
Court of Nicholas II of Russia
Sailors from the Russian Empire
People of the Russian Revolution